Joseph Anthony O'Meara (24 June 1943 – 4 May 2001) was an Irish first-class cricketer and field hockey international.

Life
O'Meara was born at Dublin and was educated at Blackrock College. Overcoming polio as a child, O'Meara would go on to have a successful sporting career. 

Playing his club cricket for Railway Union, O'Meara made a single appearance in first-class cricket for Ireland against Scotland at Derry in 1963. Batting twice during the match, O'Meara was dismissed without scoring in Ireland's first-innings by Ronald Hogan, while in their second-innings he was dismissed again without scoring by Stuart Wilson. He took a solitary wicket in the match, dismissing Malcolm Ford with his off break bowling in Scotland's second-innings.  He managed the Ireland cricket team for a period.

O'Meara was more noted as an international hockey player for Ireland, making 52 appearances. He later coached the national hockey team. 

He died at Dublin in May 2001.

References

External links

1943 births
People with polio
Cricketers from County Dublin
People educated at Blackrock College
Irish cricketers
Irish cricket administrators
Irish male field hockey players
Ireland international men's field hockey players
Ireland men's national field hockey team coaches
2001 deaths